Du & jag is a 2006 Swedish film directed by Martin Jern and Emil Larsson.

Cast
Noomi Rapace as Maja
Johan Hallström as Niklas
Saga Gärde as Josefin
Richard Ulfsäter as Erik
Cecilia Häll as Anna
Emil Stoltz as Martin
Andreas Karoliussen as Niklas little brother
Elin Ahlberg as Niklas' little brother's girlfriend
Elinor Nilsson as Maja's little sister
Hans-Christian Thulin as Palle
Martin Wallström as Jens, a student
Alexander Karim as Steve, Anna's boyfriend
Tekla Granlund as Maja's mother
Mats Malmstedt as Maja's dad
Catherine Jeppsson as Niklas' mother

External links

Swedish drama films
2006 films
2006 drama films
2000s Swedish-language films
2000s Swedish films